A. Favre & Fils is a Swiss luxury watch manufacturer located in Carouge, a municipality in the Canton of Geneva, Switzerland. Their timepieces are made from 18k gold (white or rose).

History
A record saved in the Neuchâtel State Archives establishes that on March 29, 1718, a contract was concluded between Abraham Favre and the master watchmaker Daniel Gagnebin in which the former commits to teach Abraham Favre the profession of watchmaker to the extent of his knowledge for a period of three years. This document marks the beginning of the Favre watchmaking history. Another official document dated from 1737 then mentions his son, also named Abraham, as a master watchmaker. From the fourth generation on, the trade name of the firm becomes Abraham Favre & Fils, and the timepieces are subsequently signed with the brand "A. Favre & Fils".

Genealogy

Below is a basic genealogy of the Favre family, from the first watchmaker to the actual founder of A. FAVRE & FILS, Laurent Favre:

I - Abraham Favre (1685–1762), "ancien d´église", replacement Judge, entrepreneur in public construction. First initiation to watchmaking in 1718.

II - Abraham Favre (1702–1790), replacement Judge, master watchmaker.

III - Abraham Favre (1740–1823), counselor, captain of the local militia, master watchmaker and watch dealer.

IV - Frédéric Favre (1766–1840), President of the Charity Chamber in Le Locle and watch dealer.

V - Henri-Auguste Favre (1796–1865),watch manufacturer, Captain of the local armed forces, former member of the legislative Corps of Neuchâtel.

VI - Fritz Favre (1828–1877), watch manufacturer, Judge, Captain of local armed forces, assistant to the Major in the battalion I of Le Locle.

VII - Henri-Adrien Favre (1865–1961), industrial and watch manufacturer.

VIII - Henry-A. Favre (1908–1972), PhD in Law, President of the Montres FAVRE-LEUBA Company from 1934 to 1969 and of the SAPHIR Group from 1969 to 1972.

IX - Florian Favre, born in 1942, Sales Executive and Head of Product Development in the SAPHIR Group from 1966 to 1975, Owner and President of Florian Favre SA, from 1976 to 2005.

Eric Favre, born in 1943, CEO of the SAPHIR S.A. holding from 1972 to 1977.

X - Laurent Favre, born in 1973, Founder of A. FAVRE & FILS.

External links
A. Favre & Fils Official Site
A. Favre & fils Phoenix 10.1 watch review with pictures: Quantième à Grand Affichage Rotatif

Watch manufacturing companies of Switzerland
Companies based in the canton of Geneva
Carouge